Santa Cruz River or Rio Santa Cruz may refer to:

Rivers
 Santa Cruz River (Argentina)
 Santa Cruz River (Santa Catarina), Brazil
 Santa Cruz River (Philippines)
 Santa Cruz River (Arizona), Mexico and United States
 Santa Cruz River (New Mexico), a tributary of the Rio Grande, in the United States
 Santa Cruz River (Venezuela), see Aroa mines

Other uses
 SS Rio Santa Cruz, an Argentinian steamship

See also
 Santa Cruz (disambiguation)